Halveti Teqe may refer to:

 Halveti Teqe, Berat
 Halveti Teqe, Herebel
 Halveti Teqe, Prizren